Rahmani30 is an Indian educational movement that was started in Patna, Bihar, India under the banner of 'Rahmani  Program of Excellence', by Hazrat Wali Rahmani Sahab with Abhayanand Ji former DGP Bihar as the academic head. It is modelled after the Super 30 format of educational organizations pioneered by Abhayanand and caters to Indian Muslim students.

Rahmani30 provides education and preparation for medical, IIT, CA, CS and LAW entrance education. Established in 2008, acceptance rate of Rahmani 30 is 0.1%, less than IITs. The program selects 30 meritorious and talented candidates each year from economically challenged sections of society only Muslims and trains them for the Joint Entrance Examination, the entrance examination for premium institutes like Indian Institute of Technology, International Institutes of Information Technology, National Institutes of Technology (India), Indian Institutes of Information Technology, trains for National Eligibility cum Entrance Test (Undergraduate), entrance examination for premium Medical institutes like All India Institutes of Medical Sciences, CA, CS and trains for LAW entrances for admission in the premium institutes like National Law Universities.

Over hundred students who attended Rahmani30 are now studying in Institutes of National Importance.

See also
 Abhayanand

References

External links
 Official website

Education in Patna
Indian educational programs
University-preparatory schools
2008 establishments in Bihar
Educational institutions established in 2008
Islamic education in India